Tyreeq Jamal Adeshina Oliveira Bakinson (born 10 October 1998) is an English professional footballer who plays as a midfielder for Sheffield Wednesday.

Career

Luton Town
Born in Camden, Greater London, Bakinson joined Luton Town as an under-10 and progressed through the club's youth system, before signing a three-and-a-half-year professional contract on 7 March 2016. He was a member of the under-18 team that won the Youth Alliance South East title and the Youth Alliance Cup in 2015–16, and also reached the quarter-finals of the FA Youth Cup, in which they lost 1–0 to Blackburn Rovers. Bakinson made his professional debut on the final day of 2015–16 as a 76th-minute substitute for Pelly Ruddock Mpanzu in a 4–1 win at home to Exeter City.

Bakinson was named in the starting lineup for the first time to make his first appearance of 2016–17 in a 2–1 win away to Gillingham in the EFL Trophy on 30 August 2016.

Bristol City
On 31 August 2017, Bakinson signed for Championship club Bristol City on a three-year contract, with the option of a one-year extension, for an undisclosed fee. He made his debut as an 80th-minute substitute in a 4–1 win over Premier League team Crystal Palace in the EFL Cup fourth round on 24 October 2017.

Bakinson joined League Two club Newport County on 30 July 2018 on a six-month loan. He made his debut for Newport on 14 August in a 4–1 away win over Cambridge United in the EFL Cup first round and scored his first goal on 8 September in a 1–0 win away to Oldham Athletic. He was introduced as an extra-time substitute in the 2019 League Two play-off Final at Wembley Stadium on 25 May 2019, as Newport lost 1–0 to Tranmere Rovers.

He was loaned to another League Two club, Plymouth Argyle, on 3 January 2020 until the end of the 2019–20 season. Bakinson scored his first goal for Plymouth on 1 February in a 1–0 home win over his former loan club Newport County.

His first goal for Bristol City was the team's second goal in a 2–2 away draw with Barnsley on 17 October 2020.

On 20 January 2022, Bakinson joined League One club Ipswich Town on loan until the end of the season with the club having the option to make the deal permanent.

Sheffield Wednesday
On 21 July 2022, he joined EFL League One club Sheffield Wednesday for an undisclosed fee. He made his debut against Milton Keynes Dons on the 6 August 2022, replacing Josh Windass on the 77th minute. His first goal for the club came the following week, with a late winner against Charlton Athletic.

Career statistics

References

External links
Profile at the Bristol City F.C. website

1998 births
Living people
Footballers from the London Borough of Camden
English footballers
Association football midfielders
Luton Town F.C. players
Bristol City F.C. players
Newport County A.F.C. players
Plymouth Argyle F.C. players
Ipswich Town F.C. players
Sheffield Wednesday F.C. players
English Football League players
Black British sportspeople